is a Japanese original anime television series written and directed by Kazuki Akane at studio Eight Bit. The series aired from October 10 to December 26, 2019.

On January 31, 2020, it was announced that there would be a Special Collaboration Movie and a Special Fan Movie. On May 18, 2020, it was announced that the Special Fan Movie had been completed. The Special Fan Movie was released on May 20, 2020, and takes place two years after the end of the series.

Characters

The main protagonist, a transfer student who becomes the best player in the soft tennis club despite being a beginner. He lives with his mother after his parents got divorced and spends his time doing household chores.

The captain of the soft tennis club. He is the only player on the team who took the sport seriously prior to recruiting Maki.

A member of the soft tennis club partnered up with Rintaro. He has a burn scar on his back as a result of his mother pouring boiling water on him when he was an infant.

The vice president of the boys soft tennis club and Itsuki's partner. He is an illegitimate child that resulted from a teen pregnancy who was put up for adoption. While he is loved by his adopted parents, when he learns about the truth regarding his birth he began to doubt himself. His academic skills are the best among the boys in the club.

A member of the boys soft tennis club partnered up with Shingo. He is the youngest of three children in his family. He played soccer up until middle school when he quit the sport to take up tennis instead much to his father's disapproval.

A member of the boys soft tennis club partnered up with Tsubasa.

A member of the boys soft tennis club partnered up with Taiyo. He plays tennis much to the disapproval of his mother as she sees tennis as being a distraction that negatively impacts his academic performance.

A member of the boys soft tennis club partnered up with Nao.

The manager of the soft tennis club. They question their gender identity and identify as neither a boy nor a girl, although they haven’t found a label that fits them yet. Their name is technically Yūta Asuka (飛鳥 悠汰), but they have said that they prefer Yū. They seem to have a crush on Toma. 

Maki's neighbor and a classmate. She is often seen watching the boys soft tennis club practice.

The captain of the girls soft tennis team, and ace of the team. She is sympathetic with boys team efforts, and sometimes playing with them.

The student council president. She is strict and results-oriented. Her philosophy leads her to issuing an ultimatum to the boys soft tennis club to field a competitive team or be dissolved.

Maki's mother. She got a divorce when Maki was very young and has been working long hours to support him.

Maki's father and Aya's ex-husband. He is unemployed and abusive towards Maki. He is the main antagonist of the series.

Takeru is a student of the Misaki Academy boy's soft tennis team and friends with Masato Nagano.

Production and release
On April 5, 2018, studio Eight Bit announced via Twitter that it was collaborating with Kazuki Akane to produce a new original anime. Akane is writing and directing the series, and Itsuka is providing the original character designs. Yūichi Takahashi is serving as the series' chief animation director, character designer, and series animation director (the latter credit referring to directorial duties). Additionally, Miki Takeshita is in charge of scene setting, Shiori Shiwa is serving as art director, and Jin Aketagawa is serving as sound director at Magic Capsule. FlyingDog is producing the series' music. Instrumental band jizue is composing the series' music. The series is listed for 12 episodes. Megumi Nakajima performed the series' opening theme song "Suisō", while AIKI from bless4 performed the series' ending theme song "Kago no Naka no Bokura wa".

The series aired from October 10 to December 26, 2019, and was broadcast on TBS, BS-TBS, and other channels. Funimation has licensed the series for a simuldub. From May 31, 2022, the series was moved to Crunchyroll, a streaming service that Funimation's parent company Sony Pictures Television acquired in 2021.

In October 2019, two dancers accused the show of plagiarizing their choreography for the ending sequence, and their posts went viral on Twitter. In response, TBS Entertainment issued an apology to the dancers.

After the final episode, Kazuki Akane revealed that the anime was originally planned to be 24 episodes, but the production committee had decided to cut down the length of the series last minute. Akane promised that he would find another way to wrap up his original story through a sequel.

In April 2021, Kazuki Akane said he has been unable to find a company that will fund more episodes of Stars Align.

Notes

References

External links
 

2019 anime television series debuts
Eight Bit (studio)
Anime with original screenplays
Funimation
Drama anime and manga
Tennis in anime and manga
TBS Television (Japan) original programming
Transgender in anime and manga